William John Evans (August 16, 1929 – September 15, 1980) was an American jazz pianist and composer who worked primarily as the leader of his trio. His use of impressionist harmony, interpretation of traditional jazz repertoire, block chords, and trademark rhythmically independent, "singing" melodic lines continues to influence jazz pianists today.

Born in Plainfield, New Jersey, United States, he was classically trained at Southeastern Louisiana University and the Mannes School of Music, in New York City, where he majored in composition and received the Artist Diploma. In 1955, he moved to New York City, where he worked with bandleader and theorist George Russell. In 1958, Evans joined Miles Davis's sextet, which in 1959, then immersed in modal jazz, recorded Kind of Blue, the best-selling jazz album ever.

In late 1959, Evans left the Miles Davis band and began his career as a leader, with bassist Scott LaFaro and drummer Paul Motian, a group now regarded as a seminal modern jazz trio. In 1961, two albums were recorded at an engagement at New York's Village Vanguard jazz club, Sunday at the Village Vanguard and Waltz for Debby; a complete set of the Vanguard recordings on three CDs was issued decades later. However, ten days after this booking ended, LaFaro died in a car accident. After months of seclusion, Evans reemerged with a new trio, featuring bassist Chuck Israels.

In 1963, Evans recorded Conversations with Myself, a solo album produced with overdubbing technology. In 1966, he met bassist Eddie Gómez, with whom he worked for the next 11 years. During the mid-1970s Bill Evans collaborated with the singer Tony Bennett on two critically acclaimed albums: The Tony Bennett/Bill Evans Album (1975) and Together Again (1977).

Many of Evans's compositions, such as "Waltz for Debby", have become standards, played and recorded by many artists. Evans received 31 Grammy nominations and seven awards, and was inducted into the DownBeat Jazz Hall of Fame.

Biography

Early life 
Evans grew up in North Plainfield, New Jersey, the son of Harry and Mary Evans (née Soroka). His father was of Welsh descent and ran a golf course; his mother was of Ukrainian ancestry and descended from a family of coal miners. The marriage was stormy because of his father's heavy drinking, gambling, and abuse. Bill had a brother, Harry (Harold), two years his senior, with whom he was very close.

Given Harry Evans Sr.'s destructive character, Mary Evans often left home with her sons to go to nearby Somerville, to stay with her sister Justine and the Epps family. There, Harry began piano lessons somewhere between age 5 and 7 with local teacher Helen Leland. Bill was thought to be too young for lessons, but he began to play what he had heard during his brother's, and soon both were taking piano lessons.

Evans remembered Leland with affection for not insisting on a heavy technical approach, with scales and arpeggios. He quickly developed a fluent sight-reading ability, but Leland considered Harry a better pianist. At the age of seven, Bill began violin lessons, and soon also flute and piccolo. He soon dropped those instruments, but it is believed they later influenced his keyboard style. He later named Mozart, Beethoven and Schubert as composers whose work he often played. During high school, Evans came in contact with 20th-century music like Stravinsky's Petrushka, which he called a "tremendous experience", and Milhaud's Suite provençale, whose bitonal language he believed "opened him to new things." Around the same time came his first exposure to jazz, when aged 12 he heard Tommy Dorsey and Harry James's bands on the radio. At the age of 13, Bill stood in for a sick pianist in Buddy Valentino's rehearsal band, where Harry was already playing the trumpet. Soon he began to perform for dances and weddings throughout New Jersey, playing music like boogie woogie and polkas for $1 per hour. Around this time, he met multi-instrumentalist Don Elliott, with whom he later recorded. Another important influence was bassist George Platt, who introduced Evans to the theory of harmony.

Evans also listened to Earl Hines, Coleman Hawkins, Bud Powell, George Shearing, Stan Getz, and Nat King Cole among others. He particularly admired Cole. Evans attended North Plainfield High School, graduating in 1946.

College, army, sabbatical year 

After high school, in September 1946, Evans attended Southeastern Louisiana University on a flute scholarship. He studied classical piano interpretation with Louis P. Kohnop, John Venettozzi, and Ronald Stetzel. A key figure in Evans's development was Gretchen Magee, whose methods of teaching left a big imprint on his compositional style.

Around his third year in college, Evans composed his first known tune, "Very Early". Around that time he also composed a piece called "Peace Piece". Years later, when asked to play it, he said it was a spontaneous improvisation and didn't know it. He was a founding member of SLU's Delta Omega chapter of Phi Mu Alpha Sinfonia, played quarterback for the fraternity's football team, and played in the college band. In 1950, he performed Beethoven's Piano Concerto No. 3 on his senior recital, graduating with a Bachelor of Music in piano and a bachelor's in music education. Evans regarded his last three years in college as the happiest of his life.

During college, Evans met guitarist Mundell Lowe, and after graduating, they formed a trio with bassist Red Mitchell. The three relocated to New York City, but their inability to attract bookings prompted them to leave for Calumet City, Illinois. In July 1950, Evans joined Herbie Fields's band, based in Chicago. During the summer, the band did a three-month tour backing Billie Holiday, including East Coast appearances at Harlem's Apollo Theater and shows in Philadelphia, Baltimore, and Washington, D.C. The band included trumpeter Jimmy Nottingham, trombonist Frank Rosolino and bassist Jim Aton. Upon its return to Chicago, Evans and Aton worked as a duo in clubs, often backing singer Lurlean Hunter. Shortly thereafter, Evans received his draft notice and entered the U.S. Army.

During his three-year (1951–54) period in the Army, Evans played flute, piccolo, and piano in the Fifth U.S. Army Band at Fort Sheridan. He hosted a jazz program on the camp radio station and occasionally performed in Chicago clubs, where he met singer Lucy Reed, with whom he became friends and later recorded. He met singer and bassist Bill Scott and Chicago jazz pianist Sam Distefano (his bunkmate in their platoon), both of whom became Evans's close friends. Evans's stay in the Army was traumatic, however, and he had nightmares for years. As people criticized his musical conceptions and playing, he lost confidence for the first time. Around 1953, Evans composed his best-known tune, "Waltz for Debby", for his young niece. During this period, he began using recreational drugs, occasionally smoking marijuana.

Evans was discharged from the Army in January 1954, and entered a period of seclusion triggered by the harsh criticism he had received. He took a sabbatical year and lived with his parents, where he set up a studio, acquired a grand piano and worked on his technique, believing he lacked the natural fluency of other musicians. He visited his brother, now in Baton Rouge, Louisiana, recently married and working as a conservatory teacher.

Return to New York City 
In July 1955, Evans returned to New York City and enrolled in the Mannes College of Music for a three-semester postgraduate course in music composition. He also wrote classical settings of poems by William Blake. Along with his studies, Evans played in low-profile "Tuxedo gigs" at the Friendship Club and the Roseland Ballroom, as well as Jewish weddings, intermission spots, and over-40 dances. Better opportunities also arose, such as playing solo opposite the Modern Jazz Quartet at the Village Vanguard, where one day he saw Miles Davis listening to him. During this period, Evans also met Thelonious Monk.

Evans soon began to perform in Greenwich Village clubs with Don Elliott, Tony Scott, Mundell Lowe, and bandleader Jerry Wald. He may have played on some of Wald's discs, but his first proven Wald recording is Listen to the Music of Jerry Wald, which also featured his future drummer Paul Motian.

In early 1955, singer Lucy Reed moved to New York City to play at the Village Vanguard and The Blue Angel, and in August she recorded The Singing Reed with a four-piece group that included Evans. During this period, he met two of Reed's friends: manager Helen Keane, who became his agent seven years later, and George Russell, with whom he soon worked. That year, he recorded with guitarist Dick Garcia on A Message from Garcia for the Dawn label. In parallel, Evans kept up his work with Scott, playing in Preview's Modern Jazz Club in Chicago during December 1956–January 1957, and recording The Complete Tony Scott. After the Complete sessions, Scott left for a long overseas tour.

Debut album New Jazz Conceptions 
In September 1956, producer Orrin Keepnews was convinced to record the reluctant Evans by a demo tape Mundell Lowe played to him over the phone. The result was his debut album, New Jazz Conceptions, featuring the original versions of "Waltz for Debby" and "Five". Eleven songs were recorded in the first session, including Evans' original composition "Waltz for Debby", which would prove to be his most recognized and recorded composition. The album began Evans's relationship with Riverside Records, and also marked the formation of the first Bill Evans trio with Teddy Kotick (bass) and Paul Motian (drums). Allmusic critic Scott Yanow said about the album: "Bill Evans' debut as a leader found the 27-year-old pianist already sounding much different than the usual Bud Powell-influenced keyboardists of the time... A strong start to a rather significant career." David Rickert of All About Jazz noted the influence of Bud Powell and wrote "Even at this stage he had the chops to make this a good piano jazz album, but in the end it's not a very good Bill Evans album... There are glimpses of the later trademarks of Evans' style..." Although a critical success that gained positive reviews in DownBeat and Metronome magazines, New Jazz Conceptions was initially a financial failure, selling only 800 copies the first year. "Five" was for some time Evans's trio farewell tune during performances. After the album's release, Evans spent much time studying J. S. Bach's music to improve his technique.

Work with George Russell 

Evans met composer George Russell during his tenure with Lucy Reed. Russell's first impression of Evans was negative ("this is going to be like pulling teeth all day"), but when he secretly heard Evans play, he completely changed his mind. Russell was then developing his magnum opus, the treatise Lydian Chromatic Concept of Tonal Organization, in which he argued that the Lydian mode was more compatible with tonality than the major scale used in most music. This was groundbreaking in jazz, and soon influenced musicians like Miles Davis. Evans, who was already acquainted with these ideas, began to work with Russell in 1956.

By this time, RCA Victor had begun a series of recordings called Jazz Workshop, and soon Russell, through the intervention of Hal McKusick and Jack Lewis, gained his own record date titled The Jazz Workshop and released in 1957. At that time, Russell assembled trumpeter Art Farmer, guitarist Barry Galbraith, bassist Milt Hinton and Bill Evans on piano for three recording dates, along with several rehearsal sessions. Initially, for these sessions, only the bassist was given a written part, while the rest were left, and, according to Farmer, "took the parts at home and tried to come to terms with them". The album took a year to make, and was successful enough to enable Russell to escape his penurious lifestyle. Evans performed a significant solo in "Concerto for Billy the Kid".

In 1957, Russell was one of six composers (three jazz, three classical) Brandeis University commissioned to write a piece for its Festival of the Creative Arts in the context of the first experiments in third stream jazz. Russell wrote a suite for orchestra, "All About Rosie", that featured Evans, among other soloists. "All About Rosie" has been cited as one of the few convincing examples of composed polyphony in jazz. A week before the festival, the piece was previewed on TV, and Evans's performance was deemed "legendary" in jazz circles. During the festival performance, on June 6, Evans became acquainted with Chuck Israels, who became his bassist years later.  During the Brandeis Festival, guitarist Joe Puma invited Evans to play on the album Joe Puma/Jazz.

That year, Evans also met bassist Scott LaFaro while auditioning him for a place in an ensemble led by trumpeter Chet Baker, and was impressed. LaFaro joined his trio three years later.

Evans also performed on albums by Charles Mingus, Oliver Nelson, Tony Scott, Eddie Costa and Art Farmer.

Work with Miles Davis, Everybody Digs Bill Evans, and Kind of Blue 

In February 1958, at Miles Davis's urging, Russell drove Evans over to the Colony Club in Brooklyn, to play with Davis' sextet. At this time, John Coltrane, Cannonball Adderley, Paul Chambers and Philly Joe Jones were the other members of Davis' group. Red Garland had recently been fired and Evans knew it was an audition for the group's pianist. By the end of the night, Davis told Evans that he would be playing their next engagement in Philadelphia. While the band used to play a mixture of jazz standards and bebop originals, by that time Davis had begun his venture in modal jazz, having just released his album Milestones.

Evans formally joined the Miles Davis group in April 1958. The band appeared in radio broadcasts on Saturday nights and, on May 3, the new formation made its first broadcast from Café Bohemia (its usual locale). The live radio appearance that was broadcast on May 17, 1958, and was released on the album titled Makin' Wax, is known as the earliest documented evidence of Bill Evans and Miles Davis collaboration. By mid-May, Jimmy Cobb replaced Philly Joe Jones, with whom Evans had developed a close friendship. On May 26, Evans made his first studio recordings with Davis, which were first issued as part of Jazz Track, and later reissued on 1958 Miles.

A performance of the Ballets Africains from Guinea in 1958 sparked Davis' interest in modal music. This music stayed for long periods of time on a single chord, weaving in and out of consonance and dissonance. Another influence was George Russell's treatise. Both influences coalesced in Davis' conception of modal jazz offering an alternative to chord changes and major/minor key relationships, relying instead on a series of modal scales. He realized that Evans, who had worked with Russell, could follow him into modal music. At the same time, Evans introduced Davis to twentieth-century classical composers such as Sergei Rachmaninoff, Maurice Ravel, and Aram Khachaturian.

The band's mostly black followers did not react favourably to the replacement of Garland with a white musician. Davis used to tease him and Evans's sensitivity perhaps let it get to him. However, the band began to find a new, smoother groove, as Adderley recalled: "When he started to use Bill, Miles changed his style from very hard to a softer approach."

In July 1958, Evans appeared as a sideman on Adderley's album Portrait of Cannonball, featuring the first performance of "Nardis", specially written by Davis for the session. While Davis was not very satisfied with the performance, he said that from then on, Evans was the only one to play it in the way he wanted. The piece came to be associated with Evans's future trios, which played it frequently.

By the end of the summer, Davis knew Evans was quickly approaching his full professional development; and that he would soon decide to leave Davis' group. This year, Evans won the DownBeat International Critics' Poll for his work with Davis and his album New Jazz Conceptions.

In September 1958, Evans recorded as a sideman in Art Farmer's album Modern Art, also featuring Benny Golson. All three had won the DownBeat poll.  Later, Evans deemed this record as one of his favorites. During this period, despite all the successes, Evans was visiting a psychiatrist, as he was unsure whether he wanted to continue as a pianist.

Evans left Davis' sextet in November 1958 and stayed with his parents in Florida and his brother in Louisiana. While he was burned out, one of the main reasons for leaving was his father's illness. During this sojourn, the always self-critical Evans suddenly felt his playing had improved. "While I was staying with my brother in Baton Rouge, I remember finding that somehow I had reached a new level of expression in my playing. It had come almost automatically, and I was very anxious about it, afraid I might lose it."

Shortly after, he moved back to New York, and in December Evans recorded the trio album Everybody Digs Bill Evans for Riverside Records with bassist Sam Jones and drummer Philly Joe Jones. This was Evans's second album as a leader, the first since New Jazz Conceptions, recorded two years earlier. While producer Orrin Keepnews had many times tried to persuade Evans to make a second trio recording, the pianist felt he had nothing new to say ... until then. He had also been too busy traveling with Davis to make a record.

One of the pieces to appear on the album was Leonard Bernstein's "Some Other Time". Evans started to play an introduction using an ostinato figure. However, according to Keepnews, who was present, the pianist spontaneously started to improvise over that harmonic frame, creating the recording that would be named "Peace Piece". According to Evans: "What happened was that I started to play the introduction, and it started to get so much of its own feeling and identity that I just figured, well, I'll keep going." However, Gretchen Magee claims that the piece had been penned as an exercise during his college years, while Peri Cousins says that he would often play the piece at home.

Evans returned to the Davis sextet in early 1959, at the trumpeter's request, to record Kind of Blue, often considered the best-selling jazz album of all time.

As usual, during the sessions of Kind of Blue, Miles Davis called for almost no rehearsal and the musicians had little idea what they were to record. Davis had given the band only sketches of scales and melody lines on which to improvise. Once the musicians were assembled, Davis gave brief instructions for each piece and then set about taping the sextet in studio.

During the creative process of Kind of Blue, Davis handed Evans a piece of paper with two chords—G minor and A augmented—and asked "What would you do with that?" Evans spent the next night writing what would become "Blue in Green". However, when the album came out, the song was attributed exclusively to Davis. When Evans suggested he might deserve a share of the royalties, Davis offered him a check for $25. Evans also penned the liner notes for Kind of Blue, comparing jazz improvisation to Japanese visual art. By the fall of 1959, Evans had started his own trio with Jimmy Garrison and Kenny Dennis, but it was short-lived.

Sometime during the late 1950s, most probably before joining Miles Davis, Evans began using heroin. Philly Joe Jones has been cited as an especially bad influence in this aspect. Although Davis seems to have tried to help Evans kick his addiction, he did not succeed.

Evans's first long-term romance was with a black woman named Peri Cousins (for whom "Peri's Scope" was named), during the second half of the 1950s. The couple had problems booking in hotels during Evans's gigs, since most of them did not allow inter-racial couples. By the turn of the decade, Evans had met a waitress named Ellaine Schultz, who would become his partner for twelve years.

Piano trios featured on commercially released recordings

Trio with Scott LaFaro and Paul Motian 

In mid-1959, Evans was performing at Basin Street East, and was visited by bassist Scott LaFaro, who was playing with singer and pianist Bobby Scott at a club around the corner. LaFaro expressed interest in forming a trio, and suggested Paul Motian, who had appeared on Evans's album New Jazz Conceptions, as the drummer for the new group. The trio with LaFaro and Motian became one of the most celebrated piano trios in jazz. With this group Evans's focus settled on traditional jazz standards and original compositions, with an added emphasis on interplay among band members. Evans and LaFaro would achieve a high level of musical empathy. In December 1959 the band recorded its first album, Portrait in Jazz for Riverside Records.

In early 1960, the trio began a tour that brought them to Boston, San Francisco (at Jazz Workshop), and Chicago (at the Sutherland Lounge). After returning to New York in February, the band performed at Town Hall on a multi-artist bill, and then began a residency at Birdland. While the trio did not produce any studio records in 1960, two bootleg recordings from radio broadcasts from April and May were illegally released in the early 1970s, which infuriated Evans. Later, they would be posthumously issued as The 1960 Birdland Sessions.

In parallel with his trio work, Evans kept working as a backing musician for other bandleaders. In 1960, he performed on singer Frank Minion's album The Soft Land of Make Believe, featuring versions of the Kind of Blue compositions "Flamenco Sketches" and "So What" with added lyrics. That year, he also recorded The Soul of Jazz Percussion, with Philly Joe Jones and Chambers.

In May 1960, the trio performed at one of the Jazz Profiles concerts, a series organized by Charles Schwartz. Around this time, Evans hired Monte Kay as his manager. During one of his concerts at the Jazz Gallery, Evans contracted hepatitis, and went to his parents' house in Florida to recuperate. During this time period, Evans also participated in the recordings The Great Kai & J. J. and The Incredible Kai Winding Trombones for Impulse! Records. In May and August 1960, Evans appeared on George Russell's album Jazz in the Space Age. In late 1960, he performed on Jazz Abstractions, an album recorded under the leadership of Gunther Schuller and John Lewis.

Evans' trio with Motian and LaFaro recorded Explorations in February 1961, the group's second and final studio album. According to Orrin Keepnews, the atmosphere during the recording sessions was tense, Evans and LaFaro having had an argument over extra-musical matters. Additionally, Evans was suffereing at the session from headaches, and LaFaro was playing with a loaned bass. The disc features the Evans' first trio version of "Nardis", the Miles Davis piece Evans had recorded with Cannonball Adderley for Adderley's Portrait of Cannonball album in 1958. Apart from "Nardis" and "Elsa", the album consisted of jazz standards. After the recording sessions, Evans was initially unwilling to release the album, believing the trio had played badly. However, upon hearing the recording, he changed his mind, and later thought of it in very positive terms. In February 1961, shortly after the Explorations sessions, he appeared as a sideman in Oliver Nelson's The Blues and the Abstract Truth.

In late June 1961, Riverside recorded Evans' trio live at the Village Vanguard, which resulted in the albums Sunday at the Village Vanguard, and Waltz for Debby. (Further recordings from this performance were issued in 1984 as More From The Vanguard.) Evans later showed special satisfaction with these recordings, seeing them as the culmination of the musical interplay of his trio.

After LaFaro's death 
The death of 25-year-old LaFaro in a car accident, ten days after the Vanguard performances, devastated Evans. He did not record or perform in public again for several months.

In October 1961, persuaded by his producer Orrin Keepnews, Evans returned to the musical scene on the Mark Murphy album Rah. With new bassist Chuck Israels, they recorded in December a session for Nirvana, with flautist Herbie Mann. In April and May 1962, Evans completed the duo album, Undercurrent, with guitarist Jim Hall.

When he re-formed his trio in 1962, two albums, Moon Beams and How My Heart Sings! resulted. In 1963, at the beginning of his association with Verve, he recorded Conversations with Myself, an album which featured overdubbing, layering up to three individual tracks of piano for each song. The album won him his first Grammy award.

Evans's heroin addiction increased following LaFaro's death. His girlfriend Ellaine was also an addict. Evans habitually had to borrow money from friends, and eventually, his electricity and telephone services were shut down. Evans said: "You don't understand. It's like death and transfiguration. Every day you wake in pain like death and then you go out and score, and that is transfiguration. Each day becomes all of life in microcosm."

Evans never allowed heroin to interfere with his musical discipline, according to a 2010 BBC record review article which contrasts Evans's addiction with that of Chet Baker. On one occasion while injecting heroin, Evans hit a nerve and temporarily disabled it, performing a full week's engagement at the Village Vanguard virtually one-handed. During this time, Helen Keane began having an important influence, as she gave significant assistance helping to maintain Evans's career despite his self-destructive lifestyle, and the two developed a strong friendship.

In summer 1963, Evans and his girlfriend Ellaine left their flat in New York and settled in his parents' home in Florida, where, it seems, they quit the habit for some time. Even though never legally married, Bill and Ellaine were, in all other respects, husband and wife. At that time, Ellaine meant everything to Evans, and was the only person with whom he felt genuine comfort.

Though he recorded many albums for Verve, their artistic quality was uneven. Despite Israels' fast development and the creativity of new drummer Larry Bunker, they were ill-represented by the perfunctory album Bill Evans Trio with Symphony Orchestra, featuring Gabriel Fauré's Pavane. Some recordings in unusual contexts were made, such as a concert recording with a big-band recorded at Town Hall, New York that was never issued owing to Evans's dissatisfaction with it (although the more successful jazz trio portion of the concert was released).  Live recordings and bootleg radio broadcasts from this time period represent some of the trio's better work.

In 1965, the trio with Chuck Israels and Larry Bunker went on a well-received European tour.

Bill Evans meets Eddie Gómez 
In 1966, Bill Evans met Puerto-Rico born, Julliard-graduated bassist Eddie Gómez. In what turned out to be an eleven-year stay, Gómez sparked new developments in Evans's trio conception. One of the most significant releases during this period is Bill Evans at the Montreux Jazz Festival (1968), which won him his second Grammy award. It has remained a critical favorite, and is one of two albums Evans made with drummer Jack DeJohnette.

Other highlights from this period include "Solo – In Memory of His Father" from Bill Evans at Town Hall (1966), which also introduced "Turn Out the Stars"; a second pairing with guitarist Jim Hall, Intermodulation (1966); and the solo album Alone (1968, featuring a 14-minute version of "Never Let Me Go"), that won his third Grammy award.

In 1968, drummer Marty Morell joined the trio and remained until 1975, when he retired to family life. This was Evans's most stable, longest-lasting group. Evans had overcome his heroin habit and was entering a period of personal stability.

Between 1969 and 1970, Evans recorded From Left to Right, featuring his first use of electric piano.

Between May and June 1971, Evans recorded The Bill Evans Album, which won two Grammy awards. This all-originals album (four new), also featured alternation between acoustic and electric piano. One of these was "Comrade Conrad", a tune that had originated as a Crest toothpaste jingle and had later been reelaborated and dedicated to Conrad Mendenhall, a friend who had died in a car accident.

Other albums included The Tokyo Concert (1973); Since We Met (1974); and But Beautiful (1974; released in 1996), featuring the trio plus saxophonist Stan Getz in live performances from the Netherlands and Belgium. Morell was an energetic, straight-ahead drummer, unlike many of the trio's former percussionists, and many critics feel that this was a period of little growth for Evans. After Morell left, Evans and Gómez recorded two duo albums, Intuition and Montreux III.

In the early 1970s, Evans was caught at New York's John F. Kennedy International Airport with a suitcase containing heroin. Although the police put him in jail for the night, he was not charged. However, both he and Ellaine had to begin methadone treatment.

In 1973, while working in Redondo Beach, California, Evans met and fell in love with Nenette Zazzara, despite his long-term relationship with Ellaine. When Evans broke the news to Ellaine, she pretended to understand, but then committed suicide by throwing herself under a subway train. Evans's relatives believe that Ellaine's infertility, coupled with Bill's desire to have a son, may have influenced those events. As a result, Evans went back on heroin for a while before resuming methadone treatment. In August 1973, Evans married Nenette, and, in 1975, they had a child, Evan. The new family, which also included Evans's stepdaughter Maxine, lived in a large house in Closter, New Jersey. Both remained very close until his death. Nenette and Bill remained married until Evans's death in 1980.

In 1974, Bill Evans recorded a multimovement jazz concerto written for him by Claus Ogerman entitled Symbiosis.

Collaboration with Tony Bennett 

During the mid-1970s Bill Evans collaborated with the singer Tony Bennett on two critically acclaimed albums: The Tony Bennett/Bill Evans Album (1975) and Together Again (1977).
It was Tony Bennett who initiated the collaboration with Bill Evans. The two musicians had mutual respect for each other's talent. Bennett and Evans concertized together for about two years. Although Evans was using cocaine regularly during this period, he was reported sober when recording the albums with Bennett.

Both Bennett and Evans stated that it was not just a singer with accompanist affair, but rather a mutually stimulated creative effort to enhance some well known hits with a new twist on familiar melodies and harmonies. Harmonically sophisticated piano arrangements by Evans and his extended piano solos were encouraged by Bennett to emphasize equally valuable input from both musicians.
Bennett and Evans recorded the first album in four studio sessions in June 1975, and the second album in four studio sessions in September 1976. Between the two recordings, the Bennett and Evans performed live as a duo, featuring songs from their recordings including But Beautiful, Days of Wine and Roses, Dream Dancing.

Last years 
In 1975, Morell was replaced by drummer Eliot Zigmund. Several collaborations followed, and it was not until 1977 that the trio was able to record an album together. Both I Will Say Goodbye (Evans's last album for Fantasy Records) and You Must Believe in Spring (for Warner Bros.) highlighted changes that would become significant in the last stage of Evans's life. A greater emphasis was placed on group improvisation and interaction, and new harmonic experiments were attempted.

Gómez and Zigmund left Evans in 1978. Evans then asked Philly Joe Jones, the drummer he considered his "all-time favorite drummer", to fill in. Several bassists were tried, with Michael Moore staying the longest. Evans finally settled on Marc Johnson on bass and Joe LaBarbera on drums. This trio would be Evans's last.
In April 1979, Evans met Laurie Verchomin, a Canadian waitress (later, a writer) with whom he had a relationship until his death. Verchomin was 28 years younger.

At the beginning of a several-week tour of the trio through the Pacific Northwest in the spring of 1979, Evans learned that his brother, Harry, who had been diagnosed with schizophrenia, had committed suicide at age
52. This news shocked him deeply, and some of the concerts had to be canceled. His friends and relatives believe that this event precipitated his own death the following year.

Marc Johnson recalled: "This fateful trip marks ... the beginning of the end. Bill's willingness to play and work decreased noticeably after the death of Harry, actually it was just the music itself that held him upright. He fulfilled his obligations because he needed money, but these were the few moments in his life when he felt comfortable — the times in between must have been depressing, and he barely showed a willingness to live."

In August 1979, Evans recorded his last studio album, We Will Meet Again, featuring a composition of the same name written for his brother. The album won a Grammy award posthumously in 1981, along with I Will Say Goodbye.

Drug addiction and death 

During the late 1970s, Evans kicked his heroin habit, with the help of methadone, only to become addicted to cocaine. He started with one gram per weekend, but later started taking several grams daily. His brother Harry's suicide may have also influenced his emotional state after 1979. His sister-in-law Pat Evans has stated that she knew Bill would not last long after Harry's death and she wondered if that is what prompted her to buy three plots in a Baton Rouge Cemetery, where Harry was interred. It has been documented that he voluntarily quit his treatment for chronic hepatitis. Laurie Verchomin has claimed that Evans was clear in mind that he would die in a short time.

On September 15, 1980, Evans, who had been in bed for several days with stomach pains at his home in Fort Lee, was accompanied by Joe LaBarbera and Verchomin to the Mount Sinai Hospital in New York City, where he died that afternoon. The cause of death was a combination of peptic ulcer, cirrhosis, bronchial pneumonia, and untreated hepatitis. Evans's friend Gene Lees described Evans's struggle with drugs as "the longest suicide in history". He was interred in Baton Rouge, next to his brother Harry. Services were held in Manhattan on Friday, September 19. A tribute, planned by producer Orrin Keepnews and Tom Bradshaw, was held on the following Monday, September 22, at the Great American Music Hall in San Francisco. Fellow musicians paid homage to the late pianist in the first days of the 1980 Monterey Jazz Festival, which had opened that very week: Dave Brubeck played his own "In Your Own Sweet Way" on the 19th, The Manhattan Transfer would follow on the 20th, while John Lewis dedicated "I'll Remember April". In 1981, Pat Metheny and Lyle Mays released the piece "September Fifteenth" (dedicated to Bill Evans)" on their album As Falls Wichita, So Falls Wichita Falls.

Music and style 

Bill Evans is credited with influencing the harmonic language of jazz piano. Evans's harmony was itself influenced by impressionist composers such as Claude Debussy and Maurice Ravel.
His versions of jazz standards, as well as his own compositions, often featured thorough reharmonisations. Musical features included added tone chords, modal inflections, unconventional substitutions, and modulations.

One of Evans's distinctive harmonic traits is excluding the root in his chords, leaving this work to the bassist, played on another beat of the measure, or just left implied. "If I am going to be sitting here playing roots, fifths and full voicings, the bass is relegated to a time machine." This idea had already been explored by Ahmad Jamal, Erroll Garner, and Red Garland. In Evans's system, the chord is expressed as a quality identity and a color. Most of Evans's harmonies feature added note chords or quartal voicings. Thus, Evans created a self-sufficient language for the left hand, a distinctive voicing, that allowed the transition from one chord to the next while hardly having to move the hand. With this technique, he created an effect of continuity in the central register of the piano. Lying around middle C, in this region the harmonic clusters sounded the clearest, and at the same time, left room for contrapuntal independence with the bass.

Evans's improvisations relied heavily on motivic development, either melodically or rhythmically. Motives may be broken and recombined to form melodies.  Another characteristic of Evans's style is rhythmic displacement. His melodic contours often describe arches. Other characteristics include sequenciation of melodies and transforming one motive into another. He plays with one hand in the time signature of 4/4 and the other momentarily in 3/4.

At the beginning of his career, Evans used block chords heavily. He later abandoned them in part.
During a 1978 interview, Marian McPartland asked:
 "How do you think your playing has changed since you first started? Is it deliberate or is it just happening to change?"

 Bill Evans: "Well it's deliberate, ahh but I stay along the same lines ... I try to get a little deeper into what I'm doing. As far as that kind of playing goes, [jazz playing rather than an earlier example where he played Waltz for Debbie without any improvisation or sense of swing], I think my left hand is a little more competent and uhh ... of course I worked a lot on inner things happening like inner voices I've worked on."

At least during his late years, Evans's favorite keys to play in were A and E. Evans greatly valued Bach's music, which influenced his playing style and which helped him gain good touch and finger independence. "Bach changed my hand approach to playing the piano. I used to use a lot of finger technique when I was younger, and I changed over to a weight technique. Actually, if you play Bach and the voices sing at all, and sustain the way they should, you really can't play it with the wrong approach." Evans valued Bach's "The Well-Tempered Clavier" and his "Two- and Three-Part Inventions" as excellent practice material.

Influences 

In an interview given in 1964, Evans described Bud Powell as his single greatest influence.

Views on contemporaneous music tendencies 
Evans's career began just before the rock explosion in the 1960s. During this decade, jazz was swept into a corner, and most new talents had few opportunities to gain recognition, especially in America. However, Evans believed he had been lucky to gain some exposure before this profound change in the music world, and never had problems gaining bookings and recording opportunities.

Evans never embraced new music movements; he kept his style intact. For example, he lamented watching Davis shift his style towards jazz fusion, and blamed the change on considerations of commerce. Evans commented "I would like to hear more of the consummate melodic master [Davis], but I feel that big business and his record company have had a corrupting influence on his material. The rock and pop thing certainly draws a wider audience. It happens more and more these days, that unqualified people with executive positions try to tell musicians what is good and what is bad music." However, Evans and Davis kept in touch throughout their lives.

While Evans considered himself an acoustic pianist, from the 1970 album From Left to Right on, he also released some material with Fender-Rhodes piano intermissions. However, unlike other jazz players (such as Herbie Hancock) he never fully embraced the new instrument, and invariably ended up returning to the acoustic sound. "I don't think too much about the electronic thing, except that it's kind of fun to have it as an alternate voice. ... [It's] merely an alternate keyboard instrument, that offers a certain kind of sound that's appropriate sometimes. I find that it's a refreshing auxiliary to the piano—but I don't need it ... I don't enjoy spending a lot of time with the electric piano. I play it for a period of time, then I quickly tire of it, and I want to get back to the acoustic piano." He commented that electronic music: "just doesn't attract me. I'm of a certain period, a certain evolution. I hear music differently. For me, comparing electric bass to acoustic bass is sacrilege."

Personal life 
Bill Evans was an avid reader, in particular philosophy and humorous books. His shelves held works by Plato, Voltaire, Whitehead, Santayana, Freud, Margaret Mead, Sartre and Thomas Merton; and he had a special fondness for Thomas Hardy's work. He was fascinated with Eastern religions and philosophies including Islam, Zen, and Buddhism. It was Evans who introduced John Coltrane to the Indian philosophy of Krishnamurti.

Evans liked to paint and draw. He was also a keen golfer, a hobby that began on his father's golf course. Evans had a fondness for horse racing and frequently gambled hundreds of dollars, often winning. During his last years, he even owned a racehorse named "Annie Hall" with producer Jack Rollins.

Reception 

Music critic Richard S. Ginell wrote: "With the passage of time, Bill Evans has become an entire school unto himself for pianists and a singular mood unto himself for listeners. There is no more influential jazz-oriented pianist—only McCoy Tyner exerts nearly as much pull among younger players and journeymen."

During his short tenure with Davis in 1958, when the band left New York to go on the road, Evans sometimes received cold receptions from the mostly black audiences. Evans later acknowledged that some felt his presence threatened the black pride aspect of the famed Davis band's success.  Pettinger believed in a recording, for his solo on a tune named "Walkin'", Evans received noticeably less applause than the other soloists, and for that on "All Of You", none at all.  Davis and the other band members would respond "he's supposed to be there, Miles wants him there" on the bandstand whenever audience members made comments. Davis noted in his autobiography that Evans was sensitive to the criticism and let it get to him. This might have been a contributing factor to Evans leaving the band after just seven months.

When Ken Burns' television miniseries Jazz was released in 2001, it was criticised for neglecting Evans's work after his departure from the Miles Davis' sextet.

Legacy and influence 
Evans has left his mark on such players as Herbie Hancock, Chick Corea, Paul Bley, Keith Jarrett, Steve Kuhn, Warren Bernhardt, Michel Petrucciani, John Taylor, Vince Guaraldi, Stefano Bollani, Don Friedman, Marian McPartland, Denny Zeitlin, Bobo Stenson, Fred Hersch, Bill Charlap, Lyle Mays, Eliane Elias, Diana Krall, Ralph Towner, John McLaughlin, Lenny Breau, and Rick Wright of Pink Floyd, classical pianists Jean-Yves Thibaudet and Denis Matsuev, and many other musicians in jazz and other music genres.

Many of his tunes, such as "Waltz for Debby", "Turn Out the Stars", "Very Early", and "Funkallero", have become often-recorded jazz standards.

During his lifetime, Evans was honored with 31 Grammy nominations and seven Awards. In 1994, he was posthumously honored with the Grammy Lifetime Achievement Award.

The Bill Evans Jazz Festival at Southeastern Louisiana University began in 2002. A Bill Evans painting hangs in the Recital Hall lobby of the Department of Music and Performing Arts. The Center for Southeastern Louisiana Studies at the Simms Library holds the Bill Evans archives. He was named Outstanding Alumnus of the year in 1969 at Southeastern Louisiana University. 

Evans influenced the character Seb's wardrobe in the film La La Land.

List of compositions 

Evans's repertoire consisted of both jazz standards and original compositions. Many of these were dedicated to people close to him. Some known examples are: "Waltz for Debby", for his niece; "For Nenette", for his wife; "Letter to Evan", for his son; "NYC's No Lark", an anagram of Sonny Clark in memory of his friend the pianist; "Re: Person I Knew", another anagram, of the name of his friend and producer Orrin Keepnews; "We Will Meet Again", for his brother; "Peri's Scope", for girlfriend Peri Cousins; "One for Helen" and "Song for Helen", for manager Helen Keane; "B minor Waltz (For Ellaine)", for girlfriend Ellaine Schultz; "Laurie", for girlfriend Laurie Verchomin; "Yet Ne'er Broken", an anagram of the name of cocaine dealer Robert Kenney; "Maxine", for his stepdaughter; "Tiffany", for Joe LaBarbera's daughter; "Knit For Mary F." for fan Mary Franksen from Omaha.

Tribute albums

Discography

Notes

References

External links 

 Bill Evans Official Website
 The Bill Evans Webpages
 
 Bill Evans entry — Jazz Discography Project
 "Remembering Bill Evans" by Ted Gioia, Jazz.com, January 2008.
 Bill Evans Musical Style  at Jazz-Piano.org
 "Bill Evans: Twelve Essential Recordings by Ted Gioia"
 The Bill Evans Memorial Library
 Jazz wax-Interview with Laurie Verchomin
 Bill Evans Time Remembered documentary film
 Maxine Evans, daughter of Bill Evans
 

Third stream pianists
1929 births
1980 deaths
American jazz bandleaders
American jazz composers
American male jazz composers
American jazz pianists
American male pianists
Modal jazz pianists
American people of Welsh descent
American people of Rusyn descent
Concord Records artists
Cool jazz pianists
Deaths from cirrhosis
Fantasy Records artists
Grammy Lifetime Achievement Award winners
Hard bop pianists
Miles Davis Quintet members
Milestone Records artists
North Plainfield High School alumni
People from Closter, New Jersey
People from Fort Lee, New Jersey
People from North Plainfield, New Jersey
Musicians from Plainfield, New Jersey
Post-bop pianists
Riverside Records artists
Southeastern Louisiana University alumni
United States Army soldiers
Verve Records artists
Warner Records artists
20th-century American composers
United States Army Band musicians
20th-century American pianists
20th-century jazz composers
CTI Records artists
20th-century American male musicians